The Lohan is a left tributary of the river Crasna in Romania. It flows into the Crasna near Pâhna.

References

Rivers of Romania
Rivers of Vaslui County